Sredny Ubukun (Dunda Bükhen) is a rural locality (a selo) in Selenginsky District, Republic of Buryatia, Russia. The population was 310 as of 2010. There are 5 streets.

Geography 
Sredny Ubukun is located 29 km northeast of Gusinoozyorsk (the district's administrative centre) by road. Zhargalatna is the nearest rural locality.

References 

Rural localities in Selenginsky District